Péter Nagy or Peter Nagy may refer to:

 Péter Nagy (volleyball) (born 1984), Hungarian volleyball player
 Péter Nagy (weightlifter) (born 1986), Hungarian weightlifter
 Péter Nagy (tennis) (born 1992), Hungarian tennis player
 Péter Nagy (footballer) (born 1996), Slovak footballer
 Peter Nagy (artist) (born 1959), American artist and gallery owner in India
 Peter Nagy (singer) (born 1959), Slovak musician
 Peter Nagy (canoeist) (born 1964), Slovak slalom canoeist